Abu 'Abd Allah Muhammad ibn al-Khafif (882-982) known as al-Shaykh al-Kabir or Shaykh al-Shirazi was a Persian mystic and sufi from Iran. He is credited with bringing Sufism (tasawwuf) to Shiraz.

He was a Baghdad-educated Shafi'ite legal scholar who had also studied under al-Ash'ari, the theologian in Basrah. In Baghdad he knew Ruwaym, Hallaj, and Shibli. After spending much of his life away from his hometown of Shiraz, he returned there to die.

Biography
His full name is Muhammad ibn Khafif ibn Asfakshad, Abu 'Abd Allah al-Shirazi al-Dibbi al-Shafi`i al-Sufi.

Abu 'Abd al-Rahman al-Sulami (d. 412/1021) said of him: "The Folk (al-Qawm, i.e. the Sufis) do not have anyone older than him nor more complete in his state and reality today." He once said: "If you hear the call to prayer and do not see me in the first row, look for me in the cemeteries." He took kalam from Imam Abu al-Hasan al-Ash'ari, fiqh from Ibn Surayj, and tasawwuf from Ruwaym, Abu Muhammad al-Jariri (d. 311/923-24), and Abu al-'Abbas ibn 'Ata' (d. 309/921-22 or 311/923-24). Al-Dhahabi said of him: "He is at the same time one of the most knowledgeable shaykhs in the external sciences ('ulum al-zahir)." Ibn Taymiyya names him among the great Sufi representatives of the Sunnah.

Ibn Khafif said, "In my beginnings I would recite in one cycle of prayer al-Ikhlas [Quranic chapter 112] ten thousand times, or recite the entire Qur`an in one cycle of prayer." Al-Sulami said, "Abu 'Abd Allah [ibn Khafif] came from a family of princes, but he practiced asceticism (zuhd) to the point that he said, 'I would collect rags from refuse-heaps, wash them, and mend whatever I could use for clothing, and I spent 14 months breaking my fast at night with a handful of beans.'"

Ibn Khafif reported from his teacher Ibn Surayj that the proof that love of Allah was a categorical obligation (fard) was in the verses: "Say: If your fathers, and your sons, and your brethren, and your wives, and your tribe, and the wealth you have acquired, and merchandise for which you fear that there will be no sale, and dwellings you desire are dearer to you than Allah and His messenger and striving in His way: then wait till Allah brings His command to pass. Allah guides not wrongdoing folk." (9:24) For punishment is not threatened except due to a categorical obligation.

He once said to the followers of Ibn Maktum: "Busy yourself with the acquisition of some knowledge, and do not let the words of the Sufis [to the contrary] fool you. I myself used to hide my inkwell and pen inside my clothes, and go secretly to visit the scholars. If they [the Sufis] had found out, they would have fought me and they would have said: You will not succeed. Later they found themselves needing me."

When Ibn Khafif became too weak to stand in his habitual supererogatory prayers, he prayed double their number sitting, in view of the Prophet's report whereby "The prayer of one sitting is half that of one standing." Ibn Bakuyah related from Ibn Khafif that he said: "In my beginnings, I would recite in one rak`a "Qul huwa Allahu ahad" [Sura Ikhlas:112] ten thousand times, or recite the entire Qur'an in one rak`a." "Never in 40 years was the Ramadan-end purification tax (zakat al-fitr) incumbent upon me."

He is buried in Shiraz, Iran. His tomb is a public library today.

See also
 List of Sufis
 List of Ash'aris and Maturidis
 Persian literature

References

Other references:

Arberry's Shiraz p. 61-85
Shadd al-Izar, p. 38-46
Shiraznameh, p. 125-130

Asharis
Shafi'is
Sunni Sufis
Iranian Sufis
10th-century Iranian people
10th-century jurists
882 births
982 deaths